Sorbonne University Abu Dhabi is a French and English-speaking university established on 7 October 2006 in Abu Dhabi, the capital city of the United Arab Emirates. The university affiliated with the French Sorbonne University (former Paris-Sorbonne University, Paris IV) in the United Arab Emirates.

History 

An international agreement between the French Sorbonne University (former Paris-Sorbonne University, Paris IV), and the government of Abu Dhabi was signed on 19 February 2006 with the aim of bringing to Abu Dhabi the best international standards in higher education. Sorbonne University Abu Dhabi (formerly Paris Sorbonne University Abu Dhabi) was established on 30 May 2006 by a decree of the ruler of the Emirate of Abu Dhabi (United Arab Emirates).

The University opened its doors on 7 October 2006 in a temporary building. On 6 December 2009, Sorbonne University Abu Dhabi (formerly Paris Sorbonne University Abu Dhabi) moved into its permanent campus on Al Reem Island.

References

Educational institutions established in 2006
Universities and colleges in the Emirate of Abu Dhabi
Education in Abu Dhabi
Buildings and structures in Abu Dhabi
Sorbonne University
2006 establishments in the United Arab Emirates